Edwin Louis Jucker (July 8, 1916 – February 2, 2002) was an American basketball and baseball coach and college athletics administrator.  He served as the head basketball coach at the United States Merchant Marine Academy from 1945 to 1948, Rensselaer Polytechnic Institute (RPI) from 1948 to 1953, the University of Cincinnati from 1960 to 1965, and Rollins College from 1972 to 1977, compiling a career college basketball coaching record of 270–122.  He led the Cincinnati Bearcats men's basketball program to consecutive national titles, winning the NCAA basketball tournament in 1961 and 1962.  Jucker was also the head coach of the Cincinnati Bearcats baseball team from 1954 to 1960 while serving as an assistant coach for the basketball team.  He spent two seasons coaching in the professional ranks, leading the Cincinnati Royals of the National Basketball Association (NBA) from 1967 to 1969.  Jucker served as the athletic director at Rollins College from 1981 to 1983.

Biography
Jucker was born in Norwood, Ohio. He attended the University of Cincinnati as an undergraduate student and played on the school's basketball teams during the 1938, 1939, and 1940 seasons. He was the captain of the 1940 team. Also, while an undergraduate, Jucker became a member of the Alpha Tau Omega fraternity.

Jucker was a professional baseball prospect until he decided to start coaching instead of trying to make it into Major League Baseball. His coaching career began at Batavia High in Clermont County, Ohio, east of Cincinnati. Following service in the Navy during World War II, he joined the college coaching ranks as assistant basketball coach at the United States Merchant Marine Academy in 1946. Two years later, he became head basketball coach at Rensselaer Polytechnic Institute.

Jucker returned to the University of Cincinnati in 1953 as assistant basketball coach and baseball mentor. He directed the UC freshmen to a 67–21 record in six years, while his baseball teams were 87–38 over seven seasons. In 1954, Jucker recruited Sandy Koufax at Cincinnati. After watching Koufax in his first practice, Jucker got him a work-study scholarship.

Under Jucker's coaching direction in the early 60s, Cincinnati won back-to-back NCAA basketball tournament, in 1961 and 1962, defeating Ohio State, who had the great Jerry Lucas, John Havlicek and Bob Knight, both years. His 1963 team reached the championship game of the NCAA tournament, where the Bearcats were upended 60–58 in overtime by Loyola of Chicago and All-American Jerry Harkness. Jucker holds the record for the highest winning percentage (.917) in NCAA tournament play. In his five seasons coaching the Bearcats, Jucker's team posted a record of 113–28, a .801 winning percentage.

Jucker left coaching at UC after the 1965 season. In 1966 he remained at the university as the Intramural Director and spent the summer in Spain coaching their national team. He agreed to coach the Spain national team from 1967 but changed his mind when he received offers from the National Basketball Association (NBA). In 1967, he became the head coach of the Cincinnati Royals of the National Basketball Association, a position he held for two seasons. Jucker then went to Rollins College in Winter Park, Florida where he built the school's basketball program into a national contender in NCAA Division II.

In 1978, he was inducted into the University of Cincinnati Athletics Hall of Fame. Also, the court that the University of Cincinnati plays on is named after Jucker. The number he wore as Cincinnati baseball coach is one of only two numbers retired by the school's baseball team.

Jucker died of prostate cancer on Callawassie Island, South Carolina in 2002 at age 85. He was survived by his wife, Joanne.

In 2014, he was inducted into the Ohio Basketball Hall of Fame.

Head coaching record

NBA

|-
| style="text-align:left;"|Cincinnati
| style="text-align:left;"|
| 82||39||43|||| style="text-align:center;"|5th in Eastern||—||—||—||—|| style="text-align:center;"|Missed Playoffs
|-
| style="text-align:left;"|Cincinnati
| style="text-align:left;"|
| 82||41||41|||| style="text-align:center;"|5th in Eastern||—||—||—||—
| align="center" |Missed Playoffs
|- class="sortbottom"
! align="center" colspan=2|Career
! 164||80||84|||| ||—||—||—||—||

College basketball

See also
 List of NCAA Division I Men's Final Four appearances by coach

References

External links
 

1916 births
2002 deaths
American men's basketball coaches
American men's basketball players
United States Navy personnel of World War II
Basketball coaches from Ohio
Basketball players from Ohio
Cincinnati Bearcats baseball coaches
Cincinnati Bearcats men's basketball coaches
Cincinnati Bearcats men's basketball players
Cincinnati Royals head coaches
College men's basketball head coaches in the United States
Deaths from cancer in South Carolina
Deaths from pancreatic cancer
Merchant Marine Mariners men's basketball coaches
People from Norwood, Ohio
RPI Engineers athletic directors
RPI Engineers men's basketball coaches
Rollins Tars athletic directors
Rollins Tars men's basketball coaches
United States Merchant Marine Academy alumni
Woodward High School (Cincinnati, Ohio) alumni